Jonathan Sullivan (Chinese:  蘇立文) is a British political scientist and Sinologist who researches political communications in China, Taiwan and other East Asian contexts, China’s Internet and cyber-nationalism, studies of the Confucius Institutes, and China’s politics of celebrity culture, hip hop and football.

Sullivan is Head of China Programmes at the Asia Research Institute (ARI) and associate professor in Politics and International Relations at the University of Nottingham. Sullivan is an editor of The Asia Dialogue, the online journal of the ARI. He is a co-founder of the China Soccer Observatory (CSO) with Simon Chadwick and a member of The China Quarterly Executive Committee.

Early life and education 
Sullivan comes from Kent, England. After receiving his Bachelor’s degree in Modern Chinese Studies and Master’s Degree in Asia Pacific Studies, all at the University of Leeds, Sullivan went to the University of Nottingham for learning Political Science, where he got another Master’s degree (2005-2006) and completed his PhD (2006-2010).

Academic career
From 2009 to 2011, Sullivan was a RCUK Fellow for China, Globalization and Civil Society. In 2012, he moved over to the Institute of Contemporary Chinese Studies, University of Nottingham to work with Steve Tsang, who was Head of the School, as Director of Research. In 2014, Sullivan went back to the School of Politics as Director of the China Policy Institute (CPI).

He was the Director of the CPI and Editor-in-Chief of the institute’s online journal China Policy Institute: Analysis until 2018, when the CPI merged into ARI.

Sullivan was a British Science Association media fellow who facilitated a period of work at and writing for the BBC.

Works

Books 
 A New Era in Democratic Taiwan: Trajectories and Turning Points in Politics and Cross-Strait Relations, with Chun-Yi Lee (Routledge, 2018)
 China’s Football Dream (Asia Research Institute e-Book, 2018)

Selected articles 
Sullivan, J., & Wang, W. (2022). China's “Wolf Warrior Diplomacy”: The Interaction of Formal Diplomacy and Cyber-Nationalism. Journal of Current Chinese Affairs.
Sullivan, J., Jeu, S. & Wang, W. (2021). Rising Cyber China. Turkish Policy Quarterly. 
Sullivan, J., & Lee, D. S. (2018). Soft Power Runs into Popular Geopolitics: Western Media Frames Democratic Taiwan. International Journal of Taiwan Studies, 1(2), 273-300. 
Sullivan, J. (2014). China’s Weibo: Is Faster Different?. New Media & Society, 16(1), 24-37.

Selected op-eds 
 Taiwan and the rejuvenation of the Chinese nation, China Policy Institute: Analysis. Jan 27, 2018.
Western universities are not prepared for engaging with China. Nikkei Asian Review. Dec 27, 2017.
Trump, Taiwan, and the ‘One China’ Policy. The Diplomat. Feb 28, 2017.
How the Global Media Frames Taiwan and Gets it Wrong. Global Taiwan Institute 1(13). Dec 14, 2016.
Chinese Celebrity and the Soft Power Machine. China Film Insider. April 3, 2016. 
“Asia for Asians”: Would it mean “Asia for Chinese?” India-China Chronicle. May–June 2015.
The Taiwan-China Meeting. The Diplomat. Feb 11 2014.

References

External links 

Jonathan Sullivan's articles at South China Morning Post
Jonathan Sullivan's articles at The National Interest
Jonathan Sullivan's articles at The News Lens

British political scientists
British political writers
Academics of the University of Nottingham
Alumni of the University of Nottingham
Alumni of the University of Leeds
People from Kent
Taiwan experts
Year of birth missing (living people)
Living people